Shorea falcata is a species of tree in the family Dipterocarpaceae. It is endemic to Vietnam.

References

falcata
Endemic flora of Vietnam
Trees of Vietnam
Taxonomy articles created by Polbot